The 2021–22 T1 League regular season was the first regular season of T1 League. Participated teams included Kaohsiung Aquas, New Taipei CTBC DEA, Taichung Wagor Suns, Tainan TSG GhostHawks, TaiwanBeer HeroBears and Taoyuan Leopards, each team played against another six times, three at home and three on the road, respectively, leaded to 30 matches in total. The regular season started on November 27, 2021 and ended on May 20, 2022. The 2021–22 season opening game, matched by Kaohsiung Aquas and TaiwanBeer HeroBears, was played at University of Taipei Tianmu Campus Gymnasium.

League table

Head to head

Matches

Matchweek 1 (Opening match)

Matchweek 2

Matchweek 3

Matchweek 4

Matchweek 5

Matchweek 6

Matchweek 7

Matchweek 8

Matchweek 9

Matchweek 10

Matchweek 11

Matchweek 12

Matchweek 13

Matchweek 14

Matchweek 15

Matchweek 16

Matchweek 17

Matchweek 18

Matchweek 19

Matchweek 20

Matchweek 21

Matchweek 22

Matchweek 23

Matchweek 24

Matchweek 25

Awards

Yearly awards

All-T1 League First Team: 
 Hu Long-Mao (Kaohsiung Aquas)
 Jason Brickman (Kaohsiung Aquas)
 Chiang Yu-An (TaiwanBeer HeroBears)
 Sani Sakakini (Taichung Wagor Suns)
 Mohammad Al Bachir Gadiaga (New Taipei CTBC DEA)

All-Defensive First Team: 
 Chiang Yu-An (TaiwanBeer HeroBears)
 Hu Long-Mao (Kaohsiung Aquas)
 Lin Ping-Sheng (New Taipei CTBC DEA)
 Mindaugas Kupšas (Kaohsiung Aquas)
 Deyonta Davis (Taoyuan Leopards)

Statistical awards

MVP of the Month
MVP of the Month awards were only for local players.

Import of the Month
Import of the Month awards were only for import players and type-III players.

See also 
2021–22 Kaohsiung Aquas season
2021–22 New Taipei CTBC DEA season
2021–22 Taichung Wagor Suns season
2021–22 Tainan TSG GhostHawks season
2021–22 TaiwanBeer HeroBears season
2021–22 Taoyuan Leopards season

Note

References

External links 

T1 League regular season games
Regular season
2021 in Taiwanese sport
2022 in Taiwanese sport